The Wolverine is a 1921 American silent Western film directed by William Bertram and starring Helen Gibson, Jack Connolly and Leo D. Maloney.

Cast
 Helen Gibson as Billy Louise
 Jack Connolly as Ward Warren
 Leo D. Maloney as Charlie Fox 
 Ivor McFadden as Buck Olney
 Anne Schaefer as Martha Meilke
 Gus Saville as Jase Meilk

References

Bibliography
 Connelly, Robert B. The Silents: Silent Feature Films, 1910-36, Volume 40, Issue 2. December Press, 1998.
 Munden, Kenneth White. The American Film Institute Catalog of Motion Pictures Produced in the United States, Part 1. University of California Press, 1997.

External links
 

1921 films
1921 Western (genre) films
1920s English-language films
American silent feature films
Silent American Western (genre) films
American black-and-white films
Films directed by William Bertram
1920s American films